Benjamin Barnett Rubner (30 September 1921 – 21 September 1998) was a British trade unionist.

Born to a Jewish family in Bethnal Green in the East End of London, Rubner undertook an apprenticeship as a cabinet maker.  He joined the National Amalgamated Furnishing Trades Association (NAFTA), and also the Communist Party of Great Britain, of which he remained a member until at least the 1960s.  During World War II, he served with the Royal Corps of Signals.

After the war, Rubner became a shop steward, coming to prominence in the London Furniture Workers Shop Stewards' Council, serving as its chairman and convener from 1947 to 1952.  By this time, NAFTA had become part of the National Union of Furniture Trade Operatives (NUFTO), and was elected to its London District Committee in 1954, and its General Executive Council four years later.  In 1959, he became its full-time London District Organiser, then National Trade Organiser in 1963.

In 1964, Rubner visited Vietnam, and his experience led him to become involved in opposition to the Vietnam War.  Subsequently, he was also a prominent campaigner against apartheid in South Africa.

In 1971, NUFTO became part of the Furniture, Timber and Allied Trades Union (FTAT), and Rubner was elected as its assistant general secretary two years later.  In 1978, he was elected as general secretary, and from 1977 he served on the Central Arbitration Committee of ACAS.  As leader, he campaigned for improved health and safety, such as the replacement of toxic foam furniture fillings.

He was also very active at the Trades Union Congress until his retirement in 1986.

References

1921 births
1998 deaths
British Army personnel of World War II
Communist Party of Great Britain members
English Jews
Jewish socialists
General Secretaries of the Furniture, Timber and Allied Trades Union
People from Bethnal Green
Royal Corps of Signals soldiers